Lucas Nicolás Ribeiro Nelson (born 10 July 2000) is a Uruguayan footballer who plays as a forward for Uruguayan Primera División Amateur club Huracán.

Career
Formed at youth academy of Cerro, Ribeiro was signed by Austrian club Austria Wien in July 2017. However the transfer was delayed by one year as Ribeiro was aged under 18. He joined the club ahead of 2018–19 season.

Ribeiro joined Liverpool Montevideo in February 2020 on a season long loan deal. He made his professional debut on 8 August 2020 in a 1–1 draw against Rentistas.

In April 2021, Ribeiro joined newly promoted Primera Divisíon side Cerrito.

References

External links
 

2000 births
Living people
Footballers from Montevideo
Association football forwards
Uruguayan footballers
Uruguayan Primera División players
Liverpool F.C. (Montevideo) players
Uruguayan expatriate footballers
Uruguayan expatriate sportspeople in Austria
Expatriate footballers in Austria